The 1997–98 Algerian League Cup called 1st November Cup is the 3rd season of the Algerian League Cup. The competition was open to all 64 Algerian clubs participating in the Algerian Championnat National and the Algerian Championnat National 2.

Regulation
The competition therefore takes place in 2 phases. A group phase with direct elimination and a cup phase from the quarter-finals.

The last losers of the 1st group phase of the League Cup will play the "Consolation Cup" which will take place in parallel with the 2nd phase of the 1st November Cup.

1st November Cup

Round of 64

Group West

Group Center-West

Group Center-East

Group East

Round of 32

Group West

Group Center-West

Group Center-East

Group East

Round of 16

Group West

Group Center-West

Group Center-East

Group East

Quarter-finals

Group West

Group Center-West

Group Center-East

Group East

Semi-finals

Final

Consolation Cup

Notes & references

External links
  du Groupement Professional Algeria - List of Cup Finals - rsssf.com

Algerian League Cup
Algerian League Cup
Algerian League Cup